Li Fan may refer to:

Li Fan (Han dynasty) ( 1st century), Han dynasty astronomer
Li Fan (Tang dynasty) (754–811), Tang dynasty chancellor
Li Fan (crater), impact crater on Mars, named after the astronomer 
Li Fan (Prince of Qi), son of Emperor Ruizong of Tang, born Li Longfan
Li Shu Fan (1887–1966), member of the Legislative Council of Hong Kong
Li Fan (engineer), computer scientist